Beth Herr and Candy Reynolds won in the final 4–6, 7–6, 6–1 against Lindsay Bartlett and Helen Kelesi.

Seeds
Champion seeds are indicated in bold text while text in italics indicates the round in which those seeds were eliminated.

 Maria Lindström /  Anne Minter (first round)
 Peanut Louie-Harper /  Wendy White (semifinals)
 Mary Joe Fernández /  JoAnne Russell (quarterfinals)
 Beth Herr /  Candy Reynolds (champions)

Draw

References
 1988 Pringles Light Classic Doubles Draw

Doubles